Choice Paradise is a residential skyscraper located at Tripunithura, Kochi, Kerala belonging to the Choice Group. It is the tallest building in Kerala and the third tallest building in South India. It can withstand earthquakes to the intensity of 7.2 on the Richter Scale. It was commissioned by actor Mohanlal in 2012.

It is Crowned South India’s tallest building, Choice Paradise is a luxury apartment complex set in 1.8 acres of land with open spaces, lush foliage, cosy corners, gushing streams, peaceful groves, lazy pools and every conceivable amenity. World class facilities like high speed elevators, solid wood flooring, a helipad, state of the art security systems and more make Choice Paradise a home apart. Centrally located in Tripunithura, Cochin, it has proximity to the Choice School, major hospitals, malls, entertainment centres and places of worship.

See also
 List of tallest buildings in India
 List of tallest buildings in Kochi

References

Buildings and structures in Kochi
Residential buildings completed in 2010
Residential skyscrapers in India